KKK MOSiR Krosno, for sponsorship reasons named Miasto Szkła Krosno, is a Polish basketball club based in Krosno. The club currently plays in the I Liga, the second basketball division in Poland.

History
In the 2015–16 season, Krosno won the I Liga and was promoted to the PLK. In its first PLK season, the team ended in 12th place for the regular season.

In the 2018–19 season, Krosno finished in the 16th and last place and was relegated back to the I Liga.

Sponsorship names
Due to sponsorship reasons, the club has been known as:

Season by season

Honours
I Liga
Champions (1): 2015–16
PZKosz Cup
Champions (1): 2012–13

Logos

References

Basketball teams in Poland
Basketball teams established in 2000